(German for The Door Is Closed) is the fifth EP by the American rock band Swans, initially released in 1996 only in Germany as a CD, and later released worldwide on vinyl on Record Store Day 2018.

It is particularly notable for its unusual combination of both studio and live recordings in a wide variety of contexts. Specifically, it contains early, German-language versions of two songs on the then unreleased Soundtracks for the Blind album, two studio outtakes ("Surrogate Drones" which would also appear later on  Soundtracks for the Blind, and "You Know Everything (reprise 1991)" recorded for White Light From the Mouth of Infinity and already released on the "Celebrity Lifestyle" CD single), a radio performance excerpt from the VPRO session on 14 December 1994, and two live songs from the Astoria, London, 1995.

Track listing

Notes
During the session at VPRO also the songs "I See Them All Lined Up", "My Buried Child" (which appears on the "I Am the Sun" 7") and "She Lives!" were recorded all acoustic.

References

External links
 Swans official website - Die Tür ist zu

1996 EPs
Swans (band) EPs
Albums produced by Michael Gira
German-language EPs